This is a list of songs recorded by the American hardcore punk band Black Flag. 
 
• This list does not include any alternate or live versions of songs.

• The song "Crass Commercialism" from the compilation album Everything Went Black, is not included, as it is a collection of radio advertisements for Black Flag shows.

• The six spoken word songs from Family Man are not included.

• The Minutemen collaboration EP Minuteflag is also not included.

• This list is ranked in rough chronological order, although it includes the most prominent recordings of each song. For instance, the most famous versions of the songs "Six Pack" and "Damaged I", are on Damaged. However, they were both previously released (as alternate versions) on their third EP and first single respectively.

• Similarly, several songs, specifically from their second and fourth albums, were performed live earlier and recorded in demo form prior to having been officially released.

List

See also
Black Flag discography
List of Black Flag band members

External links
https://rateyourmusic.com/list/YoLamoNacho/all-81-black-flag-songs-ranked/

Black Flag (band) songs
Lists of songs recorded by American artists